Shabu-shabu is a Japanese nabemono hotpot dish of thinly sliced meat and vegetables boiled in water and served with dipping sauces. The term is onomatopoeic, derived from the sound – "swish swish" – emitted when the ingredients are stirred in the cooking pot. The food is cooked piece by piece by the diner at the table.  Shabu-shabu is generally more savory and less sweet than sukiyaki.

History
Shabu-shabu was invented in Japan in the 20th century with the opening of the restaurant "Suehiro" in Osaka, where the name was also invented. The president of the restaurant, Chūichi Miyake, registered the name as a trademark in 1952. Shabu-shabu became more and more popular in the Kansai region and in 1955 it was also added to the menu of restaurants in Tokyo and then spread throughout Japan.

There are two believed histories. One is traced back to the Inner Mongolian hot pot known as instant-boiled mutton (Shuàn Yángròu). Because Shabu-shabu is very similar to this dish not only the method but also pot itself. 

Another one is origined from Japanese Mizutaki hot pot which is one of popular nabemono in Japan. Mizutaki has various ingredients and versions but always based only Dashi or water without taste.

Compared with other Japanese hot-pot dishes (nabemono) such as well known sukiyaki, Shabu-shabu is not so often cooked at the home in Japan. However, together with sukiyaki, shabu-shabu is popular dish in many parts of Japan, but also in local Japanese neighborhoods (colloquially called "Little Tokyos") in countries such as the United States and Canada. It is also popular in Taiwan and South Korea.

Preparation

The dish is usually made with thinly sliced beef, but some versions use pork, crab, chicken, lamb, duck, or lobster. Most often, ribeye steak is used, but less tender cuts, such as top sirloin, are also common. A more expensive breed of cattle, such as Wagyu, may also be used. It is usually served with tofu and vegetables, including Chinese cabbage, chrysanthemum leaves, nori (edible seaweed), onions, carrots, and shiitake  and enokitake mushrooms.  In some places, udon, mochi, or harusame noodles may also be served.

The dish is prepared by submerging a thin slice of meat or a piece of vegetable in a pot of boiling water or dashi (broth) made with konbu (kelp) and stirring it. Normally, the raw meat is dipped into the hot stock for just a few seconds, as the pieces are sliced paper thin so they will cook quickly. Putting all meat into the pot at one time may result in overcooking the meat. Cooked meat and vegetables are usually dipped in ponzu or goma (sesame seed) sauce before eating, and served with a bowl of steamed white rice.

General order to put ingredients into the pot 

 "shabu-shabu" some meat (The meat "dashi" will add some depth to the soup.)
 add ingredients which need some time to cook such as carrots, shiitake-mushrooms, chinese cabbage etc.)
 add ingredients which are fast to cook such as tofu, green onions, mizuna and Chinese cabbage leaves.

Once the meat/fish and vegetables have been eaten, the soup stock will remain in the pot. The leftover broth from the pot can  be customarily combined with rice, ramen or udon and the resulting dish is usually eaten last and called "Shime" in Japan. 　

The variation with rice is also called Zosui.

Sauces and dippings
A variety of sauces can be used to dip the meat and vegetables, including ponzu sauce and sesame sauce. Restaurants usually provide soy sauce, sesame paste, ponzu and several other condiment options, such as spring onions and Japanese pickled carrots, so customers can make the sauce according to their own preferences.

Shabu-shabu variations across Japan 
Most commonly meat (beef, pork or chicken) is used for Shabu-shabu but recently there are also increasing variations with vegetables or fish. For the variation with vegetables lettuce or sliced radish can be used. The fish variations are usually made with yellowtail (japanese: buri), amberjack (japanese: Kanpachi) or sea bream (japanese: tai). For some other more rare Shabu-Shabu variations octopus or crabs are used.

When the cooked meat is served cold, it's called "Rei-shabu". Rei-shabu is often sold in convenience stores and supermarkets in Japan.

Tohoku Region: Wakame Shabu-shabu ("Wakame no Shabu-shabu")

Kansai Region: Conger (japanese: Hamo) Shabu-shabu  ("Hamo-Shabu")

Toyama Prefecture: Yellowtail (japanese: buri) Shabu-shabu ("Buri-Shabu")

Hokkaido Prefecture: Octopus Shabu-shabu ("Tako-shabu")

Kagoshima Prefecture: Kagoshima Kurobuta Shabu-shabu ("Kurobuta-Shabu")

Nagoya: Nagoya-kochin (a famous japanese native breed chicken) Shabu-shabu ("Tori-Shabu")

See also
 List of Japanese soups and stews

References

Japanese soups and stews
Table-cooked dishes
Beef dishes
Taiwanese cuisine